Yeddo is an unincorporated community in Millcreek Township, Fountain County, Indiana.

History
Yeddo had a post office between 1881 and 1964. Its name commemorates Yeddo, now known as Tokyo.

Geography

References

Unincorporated communities in Fountain County, Indiana
Unincorporated communities in Indiana